Anti–Middle Eastern sentiment is feelings and expression of hostility, hatred, discrimination, or prejudice towards the Middle East and its culture, and towards persons based on their association with the Middle East and Middle Eastern culture. This is different from Islamophobia; prejudice and hatred towards Muslims in general.

United States
In 1993, the American-Arab Anti-Discrimination Committee confronted The Walt Disney Company about anti-Arab racist content in its animated film Aladdin. At first, Disney denied any problems but eventually relented and changed two lines in the opening song. Members of the ADC were still unhappy with the portrayal of Arabic characters and the referral to the Middle East as "barbaric".

Since 9/11, anti–Middle Eastern racism has risen dramatically. A man in Houston, Texas, who was shot and wounded after an assailant accused him of "blowing up the country", and four immigrants shot and killed by a man named Larme Price, who confessed to killing them as revenge for the September 11 attacks. Price said he was motivated by a desire to kill people of Arab descent after the attacks. Although Price described his victims as Arabs, only one was from an Arab country. This appears to be a trend; because of stereotypes of Arabs, several non-Arab, non-Muslim groups were subjected to attacks in the wake of 9/11, including several Sikh men attacked for wearing their religiously mandated turban. Price's mother, Leatha Price, said that her son's anger at Arabs was a matter of mental illness, not ethnic hatred.

One widely publicized incident was the murder of Balbir Singh Sodhi. The term "towel-head" is a pejorative reference to Middle Eastern headdresses including turbans and is mainly used to refer to both Arabs and terrorists. Middle Eastern, Central Asian, and Sikh turban wearers usually wind their turban anew for each wearing, using long strips of cloth that are usually five meters or less. However, some elaborate South Asian turbans may be permanently formed and sewn to a foundation. Turbans can be very large or quite modest dependent upon region, culture, and religion.
In November 2005, the U.S. Commission on Civil Rights examined antisemitism on college campuses. It reported that "incidents of threatened bodily injury, physical intimidation or property damage are now rare", but antisemitism still occurs on many campuses and is a "serious problem." The Commission recommended that the U.S. Department of Education's Office for Civil Rights protect college students from antisemitism through vigorous enforcement of Title VI of the Civil Rights Act of 1964 and further recommended that Congress clarify that Title VI applies to discrimination against Jewish students.

On 19 September 2006, Yale University founded the Yale Initiative for the Interdisciplinary Study of Anti-Semitism (YIISA), the first North American university-based center for study of the subject, as part of its Institution for Social and Policy Studies. Director Charles Small of the Center cited the increase in antisemitism worldwide in recent years as generating a "need to understand the current manifestation of this disease". In June 2011, Yale voted to close this initiative. After carrying out a routine review, the faculty review committee said that the initiative had not met its research and teaching standards. Donald Green, then head of Yale's Institution for Social and Policy Studies, the body under whose aegis the antisemitism initiative was run, said that it had not had many papers published in the relevant leading journals or attracted many students. As with other programs that had been in a similar situation, the initiative had therefore been cancelled. This decision has been criticized by figures such as former U.S. Commission on Civil Rights Staff Director Kenneth L. Marcus, who is now the director of the Initiative to Combat Anti-Semitism and Anti-Israelism in America's Educational Systems at the Institute for Jewish and Community Research, and Deborah Lipstadt, who described the decision as "weird" and "strange." Antony Lerman has supported Yale's decision, describing the YIISA as a politicized initiative that was devoted to the promotion of Israel rather than to serious research on antisemitism.

The US Equal Employment Opportunity Commission brought charges against NCL America Inc., alleging that the company discriminated against seven crew members with Middle East backgrounds. The suit, filed on behalf of the employees, stated that the discrimination led to the plaintiffs losing their jobs aboard the cruise ship Pride of Aloha. The 2006 lawsuit had the company deny the allegations, refusing to accept that it had acted improperly in firing the seven Middle Eastern crew members. Sources stated that the two sides reached a settlement agreement, in which NCL America Inc. has agreed to pay $485,000 to resolve allegations. Additionally, the company also agreed to revise its policies to ensure a workplace that promotes equal employment opportunities.

In an interview with a conservative website, Saucedo Mercer, a Mexican immigrant who became a U.S. citizen, talked in depth about her views on immigration. She stated the issue was important because people from places other than Mexico were among those coming across the border illegally.

"That includes Chinese, Middle Easterners. If you know Middle Easterners, a lot of them, they look Mexican or they look, you know, like a lot of people in South America, dark skin, dark hair, brown eyes. And they mix. They mix in. And those people, their only goal in life is to, to cause harm to the United States. So why do we want them here, either legally or illegally? When they come across the border, besides the trash that they leave behind, the drug smuggling, the killings, the beheadings. I mean, you are seeing stuff. It’s a war out there."

After the Boston Marathon bombing, before the perpetrators Dzhokhar and Tamerlan Tsarnaev were identified, several young men, mostly South Asian or Middle Eastern, were convicted in the court of public opinion.

Australia

Attacks in Spain, London, and Bali have increasingly associated people of "Middle Eastern appearance" with terrorism. A clearer picture of the impact of these events on Sydney's Muslim, Arabic, and Middle Eastern population emerged from data collected from a hotline between September 12, 2001, and November 11, 2001, by the Community Relations Commission for a Multicultural NSW, during which time 248 incidents were logged. There were seven categories of attack: physical assault; verbal assault; sexual assault; threat; racial discrimination or harassment, damage to property; and media attack. Half of all victims were female; seven out of ten were adults. The largest language groups to use the hotline were Arabic, consisting 52.4% of calls. 47.2% of the incidents occurred in public spaces.

On 11 December 2005, a violent mob of about five thousand young white Australians gathered on the beach at Cronulla, New South Wales. Waving Australian flags, singing Waltzing Matilda and Australia's national anthem, the mob verbally abused and physically assaulted anyone of Middle Eastern appearance. Five thousand people reportedly gathered at the site and marched through the streets of Cronulla, attacking anyone who they identified as Middle Eastern.

One victim recalled how the violence erupted when a man deemed to be "of Middle Eastern appearance" was walking along the beachfront with his girlfriend and "two girls turned around and screamed ... 'get off our f__king beaches' [and then] the whole street turned on them" The riots put the spotlight on two segments of Sydney's population (the white, Anglo-Celtic majority and a Middle Eastern minority) and two parts of the city: the Sutherland Shire Local Government Area (LGA), located in Sydney's southern suburbs where Cronulla Beach is located (known as the Shire); and the Canterbury and Bankstown LGAs, located in south-western Sydney, where most of the city's Lebanese and other Middle Eastern immigrants live. Middle Eastern males were tagged as criminal and un-Australian by the media brush of ethnic crime.

In one incident, two young men of Middle Eastern appearance, on their way for a swim, were mobbed and beaten on a train carriage, with both responding police officers and a nearby press photographer  fearing there would be a killing.

The latest incident occurred in 2011, when criminal lawyer of Middle Eastern background, Adam Houda, was arrested for refusing a frisk search and resisting arrest after having been approached by police, who suspected him of involvement in a recent robbery. These charges were thrown out of court by Judge John Connell, who stated, "At the end of the day, here were three men of Middle Eastern appearance walking along a suburban street, for all the police knew, minding their own business at an unexceptional time of day, in unexceptional clothing, except two of the men had hooded jumpers. The place they were in could not have raised a reasonable suspicion they were involved in the robberies."

See also
 Anti-Arab sentiment
 Anti-Iranian sentiment
 Anti-Israeli sentiment
 Anti-Jewish sentiment
 Anti-Kurdish sentiment
 Anti-Palestinian sentiment
 Anti-Armenian sentiment
 Anti-Turkish sentiment
 Anti-Assyrian sentiment

References

Further reading
 

 
Middle Eastern
Middle Eastern
Racism